P. kishinouyei  may refer to:
 Paraspirontocaris kishinouyei, a synonym for Birulia kishinouyei, a shrimp species
 Plestiodon kishinouyei, a synonym for Eumeces kishinouyei, the Kishinoue's giant skink, a lizard species found only in Japan

See also
 Kishinouyei (disambiguation)